Caesium bicarbonate or cesium bicarbonate is a chemical compound with the chemical formula CsHCO3. It can be produced through the following reaction:

Cs2CO3 + CO2 + H2O → 2 CsHCO3

The compound can be used for synthesizing caesium salts, but less common than caesium carbonate.

References

Caesium compounds
Bicarbonates